A consul is one of a number of political officials.

Consul may also refer to:

Politics
 Consul (representative), a representative in one country of the government of another
 Consul general, the head of a consular mission
 Roman consul, the highest elected office in ancient Rome

Places 
 Consul, Alabama, United States
 Consul, Saskatchewan, Canada

Vehicles 
 Airspeed Consul, a British aircraft
 Ford Consul, a British automobile

Other uses 
 Consul (butterfly), a genus of butterflies in the family Nymphalidae
 Consul (software), an open source tool for service discovery and configuration, written by HashiCorp
 Consul, a Brazilian manufacturer of home appliances wholly owned by Whirlpool Corporation
 Organisation Consul, 1920s German Nationalist death squad
 The Consul, a 1950 opera by Gian Carlo Menotti

See also 
 Consulate (disambiguation)
 Consol (disambiguation)
 Console (disambiguation)
 Council (disambiguation)
 Counsel